or Hōjō Tsunanari also known as "Jio Hachiman", was an officer of great skill under the Hōjō clan. The brother in law of Hōjō Ujiyasu. Around the Kantō region, he fought in many battles supporting the Hōjō, also contributing to the expansion of the domain of Hōjō, he was well known for his fighting skill and also an excellent diplomat.

Biography
Tsunashige's childhood name was 'Katsuchiyo'. His father was Kushima Masashige, a vassal of the Imagawa clan. Tsunashige was the stepson of Hōjō Ujiyasu's brother, Tamemasa, and son-in-law of Hōjō Ujitsuna. 
He was fought for Hōjō from 1537 and known as 'Jio Hachiman' (God of worriers with yellow flags) for his soldiers yellow uniforms, along with outstandingly creative banners. Tsunashige was the castellan (castle lord) in command of Tamanawa Castle and Kawagoe Castle.

In 1545, during the Siege of Kawagoe Castle, despite an overwhelming attacking force, numbering around 85,000, the 3,000 men Kawagoe Castle's garrison under Hōjō Tsunashige, held off the siege until the relief force arrived. He attained fame by defeating the siege. 

In 1564, he fought in the second Battle of Konodai against Satomi Yoshihiro.

In 1571, Fukazawa Castle that Tsunashige defended was surrounded by Takeda Shingen's large army. Tsunashige held off well but was forced to surrender. Then, he withdrew to his Tamanawa Castle.

After the Siege of Fukazawa Castle, Tsunashige retired from public life, and he died in 1587. Tsunashige's tomb is at Ryūhō-ji Temple near the Tamanawa castle.

References

Further reading
Hōjō Tsunashige : Miyae takayuki 『北条綱成』 江宮隆之 （PHP文庫・2008）
Hōjō Tsunashige : Miyake Kōtarō  『北条綱成』 三宅孝太郎 （学陽書房 人物文庫・2010）
Go Hōjō Ryukoden : Kaidō Ryuichirō 『後北條龍虎伝（北條龍虎伝）』 海道龍一朗 新潮文庫 （）

Go-Hōjō clan
1515 births
1587 deaths